The canton of Sorgues is an administrative division of the Vaucluse department, in southeastern France. It was created at the French canton reorganisation which came into effect in March 2015. Its seat is in Sorgues.

It consists of the following communes: 
Bédarrides 
Châteauneuf-du-Pape
Courthézon
Jonquières
Sorgues

References

Cantons of Vaucluse